Dutton is a civil parish in the Borough of Ribble Valley in the English county of Lancashire, its principal settlement being the hamlet of Lower Dutton. The population of the civil parish at the 2011 census was 238.

The parish is northeast of Ribchester.

It was part of Preston Rural District throughout the district's existence from 1894 to 1974. In 1974 the parish became part of Ribble Valley.

See also
Listed buildings in Dutton, Lancashire
Ribchester Bridge

References

External links 

GENUKI page

Civil parishes in Lancashire
Geography of Ribble Valley